Be Lifted High is the second live album by California-based worship collective Bethel Music. The album was released on February 15, 2011 by Kingsway Music alongside the group's imprint label, Bethel Music. Jeremy Edwardson worked on the production of the album. The album was recorded live at Bethel Church in Redding, California and includes a DVD containing interviews about worship with Bethel Church pastors Bill Johnson and Kris Vallotton as well as Bethel Music artists such as Brian and Jenn Johnson, Jeremy Riddle and others.

Critical reception 

James Christopher Monger of AllMusic rated the album three and a half stars out of five, saying that the songs are "bolstered by an enthusiastic crowd and the top-notch production values that listeners have come to expect from the series." Cross Rhythms music critic Stephen Luff rated the album nine square out of ten, concluding that the album "an excellent resource for churches and individuals alike and raises the bar for future live worship recordings." Jason Rooks of Jesus Freak Hideout before the album a four star rating, noting that "Be Lifted High brings some much needed fresh air to the praise and worship genre into one of the best releases this year in the genre." Louder Than The Music's Jono Davies gave the album a near-perfect rating at four and a half stars, saying, "These are amazing worship songs that make you want to close your eyes, lift your hands up in the air and sing out with heartfelt passion for God. I love this album because it has drawn me closer to God with a strong mix of melodic worship songs that have really captured me to be able to worship God." Kevin Davis was superbly positive to the album and rated it four and a half stars, saying in his review "Every song is worshipful and catchy. For sure, this will be among my top worship albums of the year. My best description of this incredible album is to remember the first time you attended a worship event that really made the hair stand up on your neck and if you want to re-live that experience, then you need to get Be Lifted High."

Track listing

Personnel 
Adapted from AllMusic.

Singers
 Melissa Casey – backing vocals
 Jeremy Edwardson – additional vocals 
 Amanda Falk – lead vocals
 Sean Frizzell – additional vocals
 Steffany Frizzell – backing vocals
 Brian Johnson – lead vocals
 Jenn Johnson – lead vocals
 Leah Märi – additional vocals
 William Matthews – lead vocals
 Jeremy Riddle – lead vocals 

Musicians
 Ian McIntosh – keyboards
 Brian Johnson – acoustic guitars
 Jeremy Riddle – acoustic guitars
 Jonathan Berlin – electric guitars
 Jeffrey Kunde – electric guitars
 Brandon Aaronson – bass 
 Luke Hogg – drums
 Chris Quilala – drums
 Sarah Fiene – cello
 Anton Patzner – violin

Production 
 Brian Johnson – executive producer
 Jeremy Edwardson – producer, engineer 
 Adam Doria – assistant engineer
 Jeff Hubbard – assistant engineer
 Andrew Jackson – assistant engineer
 Michael Williams – assistant engineer
 Jacob Wise – assistant engineer
 Paul Vallacoffman – stage sound
 Breezy Baldwin – design
 Jason Borneman – photography

Charts

Release history

References 

2011 live albums
Bethel Music albums